Iron Soldier is an open world first-person mecha simulation video game developed by Eclipse Software Design and published by Atari Corporation for the Atari Jaguar in North America and Europe on December 22, 1994, then in Europe in January 1995 and later in Japan on March 24 of the same year, where it was instead published by Mumin Corporation. The first installment in the eponymous franchise, the game is set in a dystopian future where industries and machinery has overrun most of the surface on Earth, as players assume the role of a resistance member taking control of the titular mech in an attempt to overthrow the dictatorship of Iron Fist Corporation, who have conquered the world through usage of military force.

Conceived by Cybermorph co-producer Sean Patten during his time working at Atari Corp., Iron Soldier began development in late 1993 during the console's launch and was jointly written by Lethal Xcess authors Marc Rosocha and Michael Bittner. Eclipse Software originally pitched an on-rails 3D shooter to the Atari executives but it was rejected for not being an open world title, however Marc later meet with Patten, who proposed him to create a mecha game based on a script he previously wrote that served as the starting basis for the project, which took influences from his fascination with mechas and series such as Godzilla.

Iron Soldier received mostly positive reception after being released and critics praised multiple aspects of the game such as the visuals, audio, gameplay and overall design but its control scheme, learning curve and lack of additional texture-mapped graphics drew criticism from some of the reviewers. As of April 1, 1995, the title has sold nearly 21,000 copies though it is unknown how many were sold in total during its lifetime. A sequel, Iron Soldier 2, was released in December 1997 by Telegames for both the Jaguar and Atari Jaguar CD, a year after both platforms were discontinued by Atari in 1996 for being critical and commercial failures. In recent years, it has been referred by several publications as one of the best titles for the system.

Gameplay 

Iron Soldier is an open world 3D first-person mecha simulation game similar to MechWarrior and Metal Head where players assume the role of a resistance member taking control of the titular Iron Soldier, a stolen robot spanning  of height in order to complete a series of 16 missions as attempts to overthrow the dictatorship of Iron Fist Corporation. Before starting, players can choose to tackle either of the first four missions at any given order, ranging from objectives such as retrieving new weapons from enemy bases or destroying certain buildings, with more being unlocked after completing a set of four missions as players progress further into the game, however the last set of four missions require to be played in successive order.

Later missions involve players completing more complex objectives such as fighting against enemy Iron Soldier units or escorting allied vehicles while protecting them from enemy fire. At the beginning, the player only has access to an assault rifle but players can expand their arsenal with a wide variety of weapons like rocket launchers, gatling guns, cruise missiles, among others which can be equipped on any part of the robot. If the robot gets destroyed by enemy fire, the current mission will be left incomplete and players only have a limited number of continues before the game is over, though players have the option of resuming progress by loading their saved game into the last mission set or last mission reached, but the number of continues used is kept. At the title screen, players can enter to the options menu and change various settings.

During gameplay, the action is viewed inside the Iron Soldier's cockpit and controlling it is done by holding the A button and pushing either up or down to move forward or backward respectively, while pressing A by itself brings the robot into a full-stop. The D-pad by itself is used to look the surroundings and change movement direction but holding the C button will allow to look faster, however it can also re-center the player's view when pressed by itself. Pressing both A and C will allow to turn the view much faster, while firing the currently selected weapon is done by pressing the B button and the Option button alternates between the right and left hands of the robot.

Depending on their current position, weapons can be chosen by pressing its corresponding number on the controller's keypad, matching the diagram of the robot seen on the upper left side of the screen. Pressing 2 activates the advanced controls, which lock the robot's lower part and allow players to look at any direction without changing course of movement but only 90° and turning left or right is done by holding A and pressing the corresponding direction, while pressing 2 again deactivates the advanced controls and unlocks the lower part.

Buildings can be leveled down by destroying them with either close or long range weapons and most of them have crates containing either ammunition for the player's currently equipped weapons, supplies, new weapons or repair a quarter of the damage taken by the robot. However, they can also be used for cover to help avoid taking damage. Some of the smaller buildings and enemy units like the tanks can be destroyed by stepping on them while moving forward or backward, but they slowdown movement. In addition, enemy fire such as the rockets can be counterattacked by shooting at them to avoid taking damage.

Development 

In late 1992, Atari Corporation showed Eclipse Software Design their plans for a new home video game console that would later become the Jaguar and wanted them to create new titles for the upcoming system, receiving one of the first prototype software development kits for it named "Felix" and due to their experience with previous hardware such as the Atari ST and Atari Falcon computers, they became quickly familiarized with the architecture. Eclipse Software originally proposed an on-rails 3D shooter similar in vein to Namco's Starblade as one of their first projects for the Jaguar due to members within the company being fans of said title but it was rejected by the executives at Atari Corp. due to not being an open-world title, upsetting Eclipse founder and Lethal Xcess co-author Marc Rosocha as a result, who almost cut ties with Atari for their decision.

From Autumn 1993, the team was only dedicated on making development tools for the Jaguar and prototypes but had nothing regarding to a game project before Marc meet with Cybermorph co-producer Sean Patten on his office at Atari, who proposed the team to make a mech game based on a script he previously wrote that would later serve as the starting basis for Iron Soldiers development due to his fascination with mechas and series like Godzilla. Marc agreed at the request that they "could blow everything up", which Patten instantly agreed as well and the project entered development in November 1993 in conjunction between Atari and Eclipse.

Iron Soldier was first showcased to the public in a playable state at Summer Consumer Electronics Show in 1994, where it impressed both attendees and the video game press covering the event with its visuals, which has several differences compared to the final release such as a different diagram of the robot seen on the upper left side of the screen, and development was completed in under a year. The game runs between 25 and 30 frames per second and the three-dimensional models such as the robots consist of 200 polygons, with some of them having texture mapping applied. Most of the personnel on the development team were former Thalion Software employees, with Marc and co-programmer Michael Bittner being previously involved with titles such as Wings of Death and Trex Warrior: 22nd Century Gladiator respectively. The titular mech was designed by artist Mark J.L. Simmons.

GamePro magazine and other video game dedicated outlets reported that Iron Soldier, along with Club Drive and Doom, would be one of the first titles to support two-player online gaming via the Jaguar Voice Modem by Phylon, Inc. However, the Jaguar Voice Modem itself was never completed or released, so the title was released as a single-player game only.

Release 
Iron Soldier was released in North America on December 22, 1994 and later in Europe in January 1995 and came packaged with an overlay for the controller's keypad to illustrate their in-game functions. It was also released in Japan on March 24, 1995, where it was published by Mumin Corporation instead of Atari and the difference between the international and Japanese releases is that the latter came bundled with an additional instruction manual written in Japanese.

Iron Soldier Beta 
In 2006, a prototype of the title in the ownership of video game collector Gary DuVall, was released under the title Iron Soldier Beta. 50 copies of the prototype were distributed and created by community member Gusbucket13 of defunct Jaguar Sector II website with the blessing of both the original developer and the owner of the prototype. Demand was high, given that the prototype contained significant differences from the released version including several weapons and defense mechanisms that were removed before the final game was shipped. In 2018, a ROM image of the prototype was made freely available to download by video game collector Nicolas Persjin with permission from the original prototype owner.

Reception 

Iron Soldier received a mixture of opinions from reviewers, though a slight majority gave it a positive recommendation. Mike Weigand of Electronic Gaming Monthly commented that the controls are difficult to get used to, but praised the polygon graphics and the ability to choose which stage to play. GamePros Manny LaMancha, while acknowledging that the game's controls are complicated, maintained that they don't take long to master. He also praised the polygon graphics and most especially the simple yet intense gameplay. The three reviewers of GameFan, while criticizing the lack of texture mapping, said the polygonal graphics have considerable impact. They applauded the gameplay for its variety, challenge, and addictiveness. GameFan later awarded the game in 1995 as both best simulation game  and simulation Game of the Year on the Jaguar. Next Generations brief review assessed it as "just plain, good old-fashioned destruction". Gary Lord of Computer and Video Games found it to be passable but unimpressive, remarking that "the control method is far from intuitive, the movement is slow and at times unresponsive, the missions often unclear as to how the objective is to be obtained". He and "second opinion" reviewer Mark Patterson compared the game unfavorably to its contemporary Metal Head in terms of both gameplay and visuals.

AllGames Kyle Knight praised the visuals, music, gameplay and replay value, regarding it as "a legend among Jaguar fanatics", however he criticized the sound design. Atari Gaming Headquarterss Keita Iida remarked that although movement is slow, the game's "sense of reality is actually quite refreshing". Stefan Kimmlingen of German magazine Atari Inside gave high remarks to the graphics and sound. Atari Worlds Iain Laskey praised the game's "sense of 3-D", sound design and gameplay but criticized the lack of additional missions. David Msika of French magazine CD Consoles stated that Iron Soldier surpassed both MechWarriors and Vortex. Both Richard Homsy and Marc Menier of Consoles + gave high remarks to the presentation, visuals, sound and gameplay. Edge commented positively in regards to the variety of missions and enemies, which compensated the game's lack of pace, as well as the "Amiga-style" gameplay and visuals. Jan Valenta of Czech magazine Excalibur praised its originality and atmosphere. Game Players praised the 3D polygon visuals and music, touting it as one of the "best Jaguar games yet", though the lack of variety in missions and additional texture mapping were criticized.

Hobby Consolass Antonio Caravaca praised the sound design, gameplay and replay value but in terms of visuals, he remarked that "maybe the bar has been placed very high, but even so, flat sprites cannot be shown, without shading or texture in the virtual era". Spanish magazine Hobby Hi-Tech noted similarities in its plot with both Vortex and Mazinger Z, praising the visuals, music, length, mission variety and addictive gameplay. Niclas Felske of German publication Jaguar gave it a mixed outlook. Both Nourdine Nini and Jean-François Morisse of French publication Joypad gave positive remarks to the visuals, controls and sound design. LeveLs Jan Hovora gave it a positive outlook. Winnie Forster of MAN!AC also noted similarities with both Vortex and MechWarrior. Mega Funs Stefan Hellert also gave it a positive outlook. Micromanías C.S.G. noted the title's idea to be similar with Iron Assault from Virgin Interactive Entertainment, criticizing the slow-paced gameplay and difficulty level. Likewise, Player Ones Christophe Pottier remarked its similarities with both BattleTech and Battlecorps, highly praising the title for its visuals, animations, sound and gameplay. Play Times Stephan Girlich gave it a mixed review, giving middling scores to the visuals and sound.

Score Andrej Anastasov, though criticized its lack of originality, praised the game's atmosphere and visuals. German magazine ST-Computer stated that "Iron Soldier offers a varied and fast-paced gameplay with partly spectacular graphic effects and groovy music. What else should you write about it. You have to buy it!" ST Magazine Marc Abramson gave it a mixed outlook. Brazilian gaming magazine Super Game Power gave the game a very positive review in regards to its fun factor, controls, sound and graphics. Top Secrets Tytus gave the game a perfect score. In contrast, however, Gonzalo Herrero of Última Generación gave the title a negative review. Ultimate Future Games considered Iron Soldier as a "minor masterpiece", commenting positively about the gameplay's depth and visuals as well as regarding it to be "one of the best titles on the Jag and worth buying just to see a building collapse when you punch it". Video Gamess Wolfgang Schaedle praised the visuals and sound design. Jim Loftus of VideoGames gave it a positive outlook, stating that after changing the control settings at the options menu "made a world of difference and turned an otherwise irritating game into a really enjoyable one".

As of April 1, 1995, Iron Soldier has sold nearly 21,000 copies though it is unknown how many were sold in total during its lifetime. It has been referred by publications like PC Magazine and Retro Gamer as one of the best titles for the Atari Jaguar.

Legacy 
A sequel, Iron Soldier 2, entered development shortly after Iron Soldier was published. It was released by Telegames for both the Atari Jaguar and Jaguar CD add-on in 1997 to very positive reception, despite being released after the platforms were discontinued by Atari. In 1996, a year before its sequel was released, the game's trademark was abandoned. A third entry, Iron Soldier 3, was released for both  PlayStation in 2000 and Nuon in 2001, serving as the last installment of the Iron Soldier series.

References

External links 
 Iron Soldier at AtariAge
 Iron Soldier at MobyGames

1994 video games
Atari games
Atari Jaguar games
Atari Jaguar-only games
Eclipse Software Design games
First-person shooters
Open-world video games
Single-player video games
Video games developed in Germany
Video games about mecha
Video game franchises
Video game franchises introduced in 1994
Video games set in the future
Video games with alternate endings